Territory bands were dance bands that crisscrossed specific regions of the United States from the 1920s through the 1960s. Beginning in the 1920s, the bands typically had 8 to 12 musicians. These bands typically played one-nighters, six or seven nights a week at venues like VFW halls, Elks Lodges, Lions Clubs, hotel ballrooms, and the like. Francis Davis, jazz critic for The Village Voice, likened territory bands to "the Top 40 cover bands (of the 1970s and 1980s) of their day, typically relying on stock arrangements of other ensembles' hits." He said, "many historians give much credit to territory bands for popularizing modern ballroom dancing that began during the World War I era with the influence of Vernon and Irene Castle."

Territory bands helped disseminate popular music—which included swing, jazz, sweet dance music, or any combination thereof—bringing it to remote gin mills and dance halls that were otherwise ignored by national booking agents representing genuine recording stars like Ellington and Armstrong. Many developed original repertoires and signature sounds, none more storied than Walter Page's Blue Devils, the Oklahoma City-based outfit that Count Basie joined in 1926.

History
Territory bands rarely recorded and were often considered secondary in ability. They played in particular states or regions of the country. Ambitious and hopeful young musicians saw territory bands as a stepping stone to big bands. Audiences that wanted to dance kept the bands employed.

Territories
Home territories were loosely defined, but some classifications emerged. Generally, the areas were defined as Northeast, Southeast, Midwest, West Coast, Southwest, and Northwest. In addition, some state-groupings became common. MINK comprised Minnesota, Iowa, Nebraska and Kansas. VSA comprised Virginia, South Carolina and Alabama. The Southwest proved especially fertile for territory bands. Texas, with its open geography and relatively large population, offered the greatest opportunity with developed markets for dance music in Austin, Amarillo, Dallas, Fort Worth, Houston, and San Antonio. The homegrown audiences of Texas bands were so plentiful that the bands developed to a high degree in relative isolation from outside influences. One such band was that of Alphonso Trent. Two other important groups out of the Southwest, Kansas City specifically, were Bennie Moten's band and Jay McShann's band. Musicians from the Moten band along with musicians from the Oklahoma City Blue Devils became one of the most influential jazz bands, under the leadership of Count Basie. McShann's band was on par with these groups and was where Charlie Parker began to show signs of true innovation.  Bands from Los Angeles and Seattle performed not only in California, Oregon, and Washington, but also in Arizona, Louisiana, Nevada, New Mexico, Texas, Utah, and Wyoming. The Glenn Henry Orchestra, which got its first big break playing summers at Yellowstone Park from 1935 to 1940, became a popular West Coast territory band. There were military territories, too, such as Officers' clubs and Non-commissioned Officer clubs. These clubs took bands to Bermuda, Greenland, Nova Scotia, Puerto Rico, as well as the U.S.

Styles
Audiences responded with great enthusiasm to the black bands in the Midwest. The East Coast black bands were popular in the 1920s, but swing came to that region in the form of Louis Armstrong joining the Fletcher Henderson band when he went to New York City.

Territory bands were not all swing bands. The Midwest settlements of Europeans of various ethnicities, brought their community dancing and revelry with them, in the form of popular polka bands (and also old time waltzes, leandlers, and schottisches). They played at all the ballrooms and Elk Clubs and included Babe Wagner Band, Fezz Fritsche & His Goose-town Band, Six Fat Dutchmen, and Whoopie John, a polka band from Minneapolis.

Pre 1920s
There were traveling bands well before the 1920s and 1930s. One of many examples were musicians who did their booking from Redfield, South Dakota. Redfield was a railroad hub in the Northern Plains. All their booking was up and down the rail line.

1920s swing and ballroom dancing
In 1924, according to Variety, there were more than 900 dance bands, representing steady work for 7,200 musicians. There were 68 Whiteman orchestras across the country, playing music from the Whiteman library, eleven in New York alone. In the mid-1920s, bands typically had ten musicians: two altos, one tenor (who often doubled on other woodwinds and sometimes violin), two trumpets, trombone, banjo or guitar, piano, string bass or brass bass, and drums. Sometimes there were two trombones. If the band had only two saxophones, they would be alto and tenor.

Great Depression
The Great Depression, which hit bottom in 1933, was hard on territory bands. The public strained to afford entertainment. It was not uncommon for bands to be stranded for lack of funds. Many broke up during this period.

1940s decline 
There are many theories on why swing music and territory bands declined. Here are a few:
Unions restricted the fees of booking agents and managers.
Unions required visiting bands to pay local musicians for displaced work (in small towns, unions were non-existent; but in large cities, unions often looked askance upon territory bands).
Popularity of small combos
Commercial Radio (introduced in 1922), better-quality gramophone discs, and television (giving greater access to entertainment in the home and access to different types of music). Changing technology (radio, TV, mobility, amplified music) shocked the music industry in a similar way that the internet has shocked the recording industry today.
In the 1950s, most ballrooms in smaller towns of the Midwest closed, because people could drive to the city for everything.
Record companies discovered — during the AFM recording bans of 1942-43 and 1948 — that they could profit from record sales, churning out hit parade music with just singers, who were exempt from the recording bans. This marked a period when singers became more popular than bandleaders. The introduction and technological advancement of amplification and gramophone recording led to the development of crooning, an intimate vocal style perfected by singers such as Bing Crosby and, later, Frank Sinatra. The record companies gained control over what got recorded; therefore music that was slated for a new market of teenagers was born. This destroyed several booking agencies. MCA, who broke up as many bands as it booked, moved to Hollywood. Frederic Bros. (Chicago) had a fallout with several of its bands. The Vic Schroeder Agency (Omaha), was one of the more responsible bookers before World War II but, little is known after — same with the White Agency.
Amplification also led to the introduction of the electric guitar, which enabled a very small band to project adequately in large-room settings. Bear in mind that, in the 1920s, an unamplified orchestra had to be large enough and play loud enough to entertain a dance hall of 3,000. Prior to the recording bans, the industry was bent on capturing the intent of composers as interpreted by musicians. Before the ban, gramophone consumers were primarily interested in authenticity of symphonies and famous orchestras (dance bands). Vocals, with no microphones, were only an incidental part of an arrangement. Vocals — like Bing Crosby's with the Paul Whiteman Orchestra in the studio — could not be replicated live, on stage. Rudy Vallée used a cheerleader's megaphone. Amplification and the record industry helped spur technical improvements, at the expense of performing musicians.

Female bands
In the history of traveling dance bands, all female bands are often excluded, or only given minor inclusion. Popular culture seemed to regard the musical performances dance bands provided as an area meant to be dominated by men. In the scenarios where women were allowed to join in, they were often denoted as separate. This is seen in the way many female singers were nicknamed "canaries," denoting them not as musicians, but as pretty objects meant to be on display. One example that shows just how foreign women could be considered appears in the name of a band Mary Lou Williams headed that was called "Six Men and a Girl." Oftentimes these stereotypes surrounding performing women extended to instrumentalists.

All female performers were not a new idea in the dawn of traveling jazz bands though. All women groups performing American genres of music dates back to minstrel groups like Madame Rentz's Female Minstrels. Because women could not easily enter prestigious music bands that were essentially all male, all women groups continuously popped up as groups that allowed skilled female musicians to perform. Sometimes they were put together with help from outside sources. It was not uncommon for a group to be put together by a man or a talent agency, but to consist of all female performers. Sometimes performers received aide from family or friends involved in the business to help get their foot in the door. For instance, Lil Hardin Armstrong had an all woman dance band in the early 1930s. This group went by such names as "Lil Armstrong and Her Swing Band." Other bands popular in the 1930s include The Harlem Playgirls, The Dixie Sweethearts, the Darlings of Rhythm, and Gertrude Long and Her Rambling Night Hawks.

Even banding together with other women though, public perception would sometimes view all female bands as "all-girl gimmicks." Some talented musicians avoided joining all female bands in the fear that their talent would be disregarded in such a context. Yet all female bands were also forced into the feminine appearances they were also demeaned for. In many ways, this made being in a traveling dance band more difficult for women than it had been for men. After a night spent traveling women were expected to be visions of beauty with perfect make up, hair, and personalities. Often the ultra feminine clothes they had to wear, such as strapless dress and high heels, also affected their ability to play and perform. As had been shown in previous attempts women had made to broach men's groups, attempting to break away from this dainty female image, could call the sexuality and morality of a performer into question. Yet women's performances were also often debased to their visual looks and sexual attractiveness, even though many reviewers criticized them for these elements.

A certain need to prove themselves seemed to exist among many of the female musicians who worked in dance bands. These performers inherited a lot of the stereotypes that surrounded their previous female performer counterparts: chorus line girls and girl singers. The sexual objectification of women that haunted those two careers was also a part of being in an all female band. Furthermore, chorus line girls had an association with loose morals and even prostitution, and loss of face for an instrumentalist could mean the end of a career. These kinds of associations also made many people assume that female instrumentalists were not talented players. Upon interviewing later in life, many women insisted that they were talented musicians who knew how to play. This insistence seems to be in direct reaction to the claims that circulated that female musicians were not meant to play well, but simply to look pretty. While it is true that many agencies required photographs in their applications to join female bands, the musicians in them still tended to be quite talented.

While many people view the end of the swing era as the opening of World War II, this was not the case for all woman dance bands. Instead, they flourished during the 1940s. Swing music became a form of patriotism to a country at war. The all-girl bands that did the best at this time, tended to be groups formed before American involvement in the war. Once it was realized that women could fill a major hole in the entertainment industry and that they could not be drafted, agencies and managers everywhere began trying to put together all female bands. In many ways, these musicians were very prepared to take over for the men because they had more advanced experience in playing instruments, either from hobbies or school bands. They were certainly more prepared for musical performance than many women were prepared for welding and factory work. Some groups connected to academic organizations, such as the International Sweethearts of Rhythm or the Prairie View Co-eds did very well at this time. These groups of industrious young women could come to represent an image of what the United States was at war for. Some of these groups even did USO tours. Soldiers shipped off to foreign lands, under the pressure war and deprived of any female presence were more than welcoming to these all woman groups. The armed audiences were known to have shown extreme appreciation for these female performers V-discs, recorded for broadcast on the Armed Forces Radio Network, often featured all-girl groups.

Ethnicity and race 
There were black bands and white bands, and bands of various immigrant ethnicities. There were also all-female bands, such as the International Sweethearts of Rhythm.

Musician, composer, and scholar Gunther Schuller asserted in one of his books, The Swing Era: The Development of Jazz, 1930–1945 (The History of Jazz, Vol. 2) that, "territory bands, by definition, were black. There were, of course, many white bands in the 'territories' but they tended to have the more lucrative and permanent jobs and therefore not required to travel as much as the black bands." Another musician (former territory band musician and historian), Jack Behrens, expressed in a book that Schuller's depiction of divergent work conditions was narrow. "During my playing days in the 1940s and 50s in several white territory bands, we didn't have "lucrative and permanent jobs" unless you count day labor in a dairy bar or clerking at a military surplus store. Worse, there were times we didn't get paid at all and we had little recourse given the cost of legal advice."

For most territory bands — whether black, white, integrated, male, female — the musicians were nearly always paid. Neither the booking agencies nor the musicians got rich, but regular salaries helped maintain pretty decent musicianship.

Most musicians witnessed and experienced Jim Crow laws. One common present-day misconception is that Jim Crow practices were more prevalent in the South. The practices were prevalent everywhere, especially in New York City and the Midwest. The bands that were racially integrated commonly experienced problems, mostly from having to dodge different applications and degrees of Jim Crow among cities and regions. Many bands, especially The International Sweethearts of Rhythm, handled some of the absurdities with a degree of inward, sarcastic humor. When musicians grew wary or even felt vulnerable to injustices of Jim Crow, the band bus, for those who had one, served as a safe haven.

Bands and bandleaders

Alabama
 Carolina Cotton Pickers

Arkansas
 Original Yellowjackets

Colorado
 George Morrison

Florida
 Ross De Luxe Syncopators
 Smiling Billy Stewart's Celery City Serenaders (Florida)

Georgia
 J. Neal Montgomery & His Orchestra (Henry Mason, Trumpet) (Atlanta)

Illinois
 Earl Hines (Chicago)

Missouri
 Art Bronson's Bostonians
 Coon-Sanders Original Nighthawk Orchestra
 Andy Kirk and his Twelve Clouds of Joy (Kansas City)
 George E. Lee and His Singing Novelty Orchestra (Kansas City)
 Bennie Moten's Kansas City Orchestra
 Jeter-Pillars Club Plantation Orchestra
 Original Saint Louis Crackerjacks
 Red Perkins & His Dixie Ramblers

Nebraska
 Little John Beecher
 Verne Byers Orchestra
 Bob Calame
 Lloyd Hunter's Serenaders
 Al Hudson
 Preston Love
 Clarence Love
 Dick Mango Orchestra
 Walter Martie
 Nat Towles
 Anna Mae Winburn

New York
 Cab Calloway (New York)
 Casa Loma Orchestra (Detroit, then New York)
 Harlem Playgirls
 Edgar Hayes (New York)
 Gene Kardos & His Orchestra (New York)
 Jimmie Lunceford's Orchestra (Buffalo)
 Mills Blue Rhythm Band (New York)
 Dave Nelson's Harlem Hot Shots (New York)
 Willard Robison & His Orchestra (New York)
 Savoy Sultans (Savoy in Harlem)
 Chick Webb (New York)

Oklahoma
 Walter Page's Oklahoma City Blue Devils

Ohio
 Chubb-Steinberg Orchestra
 The Wolverines
 Austin Wylie's Golden Pheasant Orchestra
 Zach Whyte's Chocolate Beau Brummels

Tennessee
 Snooks and His Memphis Stompers
 Slim Lamar and his Southerners
 Mart Britt and his Orchestra

Texas
 Don Albert Band
 Blue Syncopaters, El Paso
 Joe Buzze and His Orchestra, Waco
 Sunny Clapp's Band
 Happy Black Aces
 Clifford "Boots" Douglas and his Buddies
 Troy Floyd San Antonio
 Fred Gardner's Texas University Troubadours
 Milt Larkins, Houston
 Peck's Bad Boys (Peck Kelley)
 Alphonso Trent

Wisconsin
 Grant Moore and His Black Devils, Milwaukee
 Johnny Nugent Band Fox Valley

Unsorted
 Tommy Allan
 Buster Bailey
 C.S. Belton
 Bill Brown & His Brownies
 Sonny Clay Plantation Orchestra
 Ernest Coycault
 Deluxe Melody Boys
 Wilbur DeParis
 Tommy Douglas and His Orchestra
 Babe Egan's Hollywood Redheads
 Charles Fultcher Band (southern territory)
 Gabe Garland Band
 Frankie and Johnnie Gilliland Orchestra, Charlotte
 Mal Hallett (New England)
 Tiny Hill and the Hilltoppers
 Alex Jackson's Plantation Orchestra
 Willie Jones
 Jimmie Joy's Baker Hotel Orchestra
 Julia Lee
 Floyd Mills & His Marylanders
 Jerry Mosher
 Jimmy "Dancing Shoes" Palmer
 Leo Peeper and His Orchestra
 Doc Ross
 Jimmy Rushing
 Jack Russell and His Sweet Rhythmic Orchestra
 Snookum Russell
 Scranton Sirens Orchestra
 Buster Smith
 Sammy Stevens
 Royce Stoenner Orchestra
 Jesse Stone's Blue Serenaders
 Jimmy Thomas
 Washboard Rhythm Boys

See also
 Fred Astaire
 Vernon and Irene Castle
 Big bands
 Castle Walk
 East Coast Swing
 Jive
 Lindy Hop
 National Ballroom Operators Association
 Swing dance
 Swing era
 Swing music
 West Coast Swing

References

External links
 Territory Bands Data Base, maintained by Thomas Meyer, Hamburg, Germany; formerly nfo.net of the late Murray L. Pfeffer (1926–2008)
 Michelle Linsey Holland, Where East Texas Dances: The Cooper Club of Henderson, Rusk County, and Popular Dance Bands, 1932-1942, Masters Thesis, Baylor University (May 2007)
 Lee Barron (1915–1993) (author's real name is El Roy Vernon Lee), Odyssey of the Mid-Nite Flyer: a history of Midwest bands, publisher – El Roy V. Lee, (c1987) 

20th century in music
American music history
Jazz culture
Jazz terminology
Musical terminology
Occupations in music
Types of musical groups